Ciechów  is a village in the administrative district of Gmina Środa Śląska, within Środa Śląska County, Lower Silesian Voivodeship, in south-western Poland.

The village has a population of 2,000.

History
Since the Middle Ages, the area was part of Piast-ruled Poland, and later on, it was also part of Bohemia (Czechia), Prussia and Germany. During World War II, it was the location of a forced labour subcamp of the Nazi German prison for youth in Wołów. In 1945, following Germany's defeat in World War II, the village became again part of Poland.

Sports
The local football team is Porcelana Ciechów. It competes in the lower leagues.

See also
 Średzka Woda

References

Villages in Środa Śląska County